is the studio album by Japanese rock band Spitz, released in October 2007.

The album includes a smash hit "Mahou no Kotoba", released as a single in 2006. It was featured as the theme song for Honey and Clover, a film adaptation of a manga whose title was named after the Spitz's 1995 album and Shikao Suga's debut album.

Further two singles "Looking for" and "Gunjou" were released prior to the album. One of them, The Cure-esque "Gunjou" features Takuya Ohashi (a lead vocalist of the duo Sukima Switch) and Kana Uemura on guest vocals, and comedy double act Ungirls appeared on its promotional film.

In terms of sales, Sazanami became the least successful album since their breakthrough in the 1990s; although it debuted at the pinnacle of the Japanese Oricon chart and has been certified platinum by the RIAJ.

After the album was issued, the band embarked on the concert tour entitled Sazanami OTR.

Track listing
All songs written and composed by Masamune Kusano, arranged and produced by Spitz and Seiji Kameda (except strings arrangement for "Mahou no Kotoba" and "Sazanami" by Kameda)

Compact disc edition
 - 3:18
 - 3:56
 - 4:20
 - 4:01
 - 4:32
 - 4:49
 - 3:09
"P" - 4:19
 4:03
 - 3:37
 - 3:47
 - 4:47
  - 3:36

LP edition with additional tracks

Side one
  - 3:36
 - 4:49
 - 3:09
"P" - 4:19

Side two
 - 3:12
 4:03
 - 3:37
 - 4:47

Side three
 - 3:56
 - 5:17
 - 4:20
 - 3:06

Side four
 - 3:18
 - 3:47
 - 4:01
 - 4:32

Chart positions

Certification

References

2007 albums
Spitz (band) albums